Rajakkapet is a village in Dubbak Mandal, Medak District, Telangana, India.

External links
రాజక్కపేట సమీపంలోని శ్రీ రేకులకుంట మల్లికార్జున స్వామి మరియు యల్లమ్మ తల్లి దేవాలయం అతి పురాతన ఆలయం గా చెప్పబడుతుంది. మొదటగా తానీ బండలు వద్ద ఉన్న మల్లన్న తరువాత రేకులకుంట కి వెళ్ళాడు అని ప్రతీతి.  రాజక్కపేట లోని శ్రీ సీతా రామాంజనేయు దేవాలయం మంచి ఆహ్లాదకరమైన వాతావరణం లో ఉంది. ఈ గ్రామము లో దసరా వేళ జరిగే అమ్మ వారి నవరాత్రి ఉత్సవాలు శ్రీ దుర్గ మాత ఉత్సవ కమిటీ ఆధ్వర్యంలో అంగ రంగ వైభవంగా జరుగుతాయి. 

Villages in Medak district